Julio Benitez (born July 30, 2005) is an American professional soccer player who plays as a midfielder for USL League One club Forward Madison FC, on loan from Real Salt Lake.

Club career
Benitez spent two years with the Real Salt Lake academy in Arizona, where he scored 4 goals in 17 appearances. On March 16, 2021, Benitez signed with Salt Lake's USL Championship side Real Monarchs. He made his professional debut on June 23, 2021, starting and playing 62-minutes in a 1–1 draw with Tacoma Defiance.

On January 12, 2022, Benitez signed a homegrown player deal with Real Salt Lake through to 2025.

Career statistics

Personal
Benitez's father was from Guadalajara, Mexico.

References

External links
 Profile at Real Salt Lake
 Profile at USL Championship

2005 births
American soccer players
Association football midfielders
Living people
Forward Madison FC players
Real Monarchs players
Real Salt Lake players
Soccer players from Arizona
Sportspeople from Mesa, Arizona
United States men's youth international soccer players
USL Championship players
USL League One players
American sportspeople of Mexican descent
Homegrown Players (MLS)
MLS Next Pro players
Major League Soccer players